The 1960–61 Washington Huskies men's basketball team represented the University of Washington for the 1960–61 NCAA University Division basketball season. Led by second-year head coach John Grayson, the Huskies were members of the Athletic Association of Western Universities (Big Five) and played their home games on campus at Hec Edmundson Pavilion in Seattle, Washington.

References

External links
Sports Reference – Washington Huskies: 1960–61 basketball season

Washington Huskies men's basketball seasons
Washington Huskies
Washington
Washington